The MSP Groza ("thunderstorm") silent pistol is an over and under, double-barrel, derringer-type firearm designed in the Soviet Union in 1972. The firearm is chambered for the silent 7.62×38 SP-3 cartridge which can be loaded via a two-round clip. The weapon was designed at the request of the Soviet special services. It is no longer in production, having been superseded by more modern designs.

The weapon was used operationally in Afghanistan and in Central America during the Cold War. An FMLN supplied MSP is believed to have been the weapon used to assassinate Contras leader Enrique Bermúdez.

Design
The Groza uses a specialised cartridge. When fired, an internal piston within the cartridge launches the bullet forward and retains all the gases within the case, thus making a near silent weapon with almost no flash.

To load the weapon the user would depress a button, allowing the barrels to tilt forward and exposing the breech for manual loading either by individual cartridge or with the use of a disposable 2-round clip.

See also
 Derringer
 PSS Silent Pistol
 S4M

References

External links
 MSP silent pistol (USSR / Russia)
 Юрий Пономарёв "МСП. Русский «Дерринджер» или «карманный бокфлинт»?", КАЛАШНИКОВ. ОРУЖИЕ, БОЕПРИПАСЫ, СНАРЯЖЕНИЕ, 2006/3
 Video of MSP
 http://www.forgottenweapons.com/russian-silent-ammunition/

7.62 mm firearms
Pistols of the Soviet Union
Multiple-barrel firearms
Military equipment introduced in the 1970s